Najas hagerupii, called the West African water nymph, is an aquatic plant growing in fresh water rivers and ponds. It is a rare and little-known species known only from the West African nations of Ghana and Mali.

References

hagerupii
Aquatic plants
Flora of Ghana
Flora of Mali
Plants described in 1952